Cory Williams (born August 5, 1981), also known as Mr. Safety, is an American YouTube personality who, until early 2013, lived in Thousand Oaks, California. He then resided in Eagle River, Alaska, until July 2017. Williams currently resides in Oklahoma. "The Mean Kitty Song" was his most popular video, with over 90 million views, until December 2018 when his video, "How To Get A Kitty Belly", surpassed it, reaching over 168 million views.

Personal life
Williams was diagnosed with ADD as a child. He has said on one of his videos that he does not have hyperactivity, and currently only has ADD.

Williams became engaged to Stephanie Roby (known as "SMPlady" on YouTube) in April 2007, and they were wed in September 2009, with a reception that was live-streamed.  However, their relationship ended in January 2011, after over six years of being together and over a year of marriage.

By November 2011, Cory was dating Kathleen Victoria Elliot (known as "Katers17" and "Katersoneseven" on YouTube), his longtime roommate, friend, and fellow video blogger. They publicly revealed their relationship in December 2011 on New Year's Eve, via a YouTube vlog on Elliot's Katersoneseven channel. In May 2013, it was announced that the two were engaged via a relationship status on Williams's Facebook profile and a video on Elliot's Katersoneseven channel. However, in February 2014, Williams announced that he and Elliot had ended their relationship.

In July 2014, Williams traveled from Los Angeles to Alaska, filming the trip, planning to live permanently in the state. In August 2014, Williams announced that he was buying a house with a woman named Kristen Swift. She was introduced with no specific details as to her identity as part of a "date" vlog on June 7, 2014. The couple was engaged on December 21, 2014, and were married on May 23, 2015. It was announced on October 26, 2015, that they were expecting a baby. On his public Facebook page, Cory announced that his wife Kristen had given birth to their daughter Chell Marie Williams on June 23, 2016, at 7:15pm local time. It was revealed on September 27, 2017, that Cory and Kristen were expecting their second child. On December 1, 2017, they announced the baby's sex was male, and on March 26, 2018, they announced the baby's name was Atlas, after a Greek god meaning strength. Atlas Cade Williams was born on June 3, 2018. Both children's name referencing Williams' favourite game series, Portal.

Early life and work
Williams had previously been filming comedy sketches in his younger years. In 2006, Williams uploaded two videos to his YouTube channel, SMP Films of his first comedy sketches from 1999. These videos were called, "Turlock Cops" and "STOPMAN."

Williams started streaming online video in March 2005 on Newgrounds. He developed a following by posting original music tracks to his MySpace profile, leading MySpace to sponsor him on a cross-country tour.  In September 2005, Golden Palace Casino sponsored Williams, making him the first video blogger to receive corporate sponsorship. Williams is the creator of SMP Films, which was named after his friends in his hometown of Hilmar, California.  The "SMP" stands for "Simple Minded People."

YouTube
Williams' video output includes music, sketch comedy and short films. , Williams' YouTube channel, smpfilms, has acquired over 625,000 subscribers and over 193 million video views. He was also one of the first 30 users to be chosen for YouTube's revenue-sharing "partner" program.

Williams also owns a secondary channel, named DudeLikeHELLA (later renamed LiveEachDay on October 23, 2016), on which he posts vlogs and video diaries showing his daily life and opinions. , this channel has over 431,000 subscribers and over 107 million video views.

Mr. Safety, another channel owned by Williams, was created in March 2014 and includes music videos made by himself. , it has obtained over 55,000 subscribers and over 17 million video views.

"The Mean Kitty Song" or "Hey Little Sparta," based on his cat with the same name, is Williams' most popular video. , it has attracted over 90 million views. In one year, it became the top 21 of YouTube's list of all-time favorite videos, number 1 all-time most discussed Pets & Animals video, and number 4 all-time most-viewed Pets & Animals video, and is the No. 1 all-time favorite video in the Pets & Animals section.  The video was also aired by a number of television shows, including CBS' The Early Show.

Williams regularly appeared on Kate Elliott's daily vlogs until she closed her channel. His cats, Loki and Sparta (often referred to as Poki and Moo, respectively) also made appearances.

On December 10, 2008, Williams was mentioned on the front page of The New York Times as being one of YouTube's top earners.  "Half of the profits come from YouTube’s advertisements, and the other half come from sponsorships and product placements within his videos."

On September 17, 2014, Williams posted a vlog titled, "Chuck E. Cheese STOLE MY VIDEO!" in which he discovers and talks about Chuck E. Cheese's stealing one of his Mean Kitty videos, even though it lacked a Creative Commons license. Chuck E. Cheese posted a response on the same day, ensuring that his stolen video is no longer playing in their stores and that they have reached out to him about it. He got a response a day later, however on September 25, he later said that Chuck E. Cheese's was lying when they said they were working things out with him and detailed his disappointment with them.

On October 13, 2014, Williams uploaded a video entitled, "Coolest Sound Ever" to his DudeLikeHELLA channel in which he skips a rock against a frozen lake and it makes an interesting sound due to flexural waves. It went viral, obtaining over 6.4 million views in five days, making it his most popular video on that channel, and led to news interviews and articles about the video.

On October 22, 2016, Williams changed his YouTube channel name from DudeLikeHELLA to LiveEachDay, stating that the latter name is a reminder to live in the moment and enjoy every day. He gives tribute to the five years he used the channel's original name and produces a video with the new name.

On March 31, 2018, a video on "TheMeanKitty" channel reported that Loki had died at the age of 10. The video did not mention the cause of death.

On June 14, 2020, Williams posted a video on his YouTube channel “TheMeanKitty” that Sparta could not move from his waist down and can be seen panting. Less than an hour later, Cory took Sparta to the vet and found out he had an underlying heart disease that they did not know about. The heart disease had led to a saddle thrombus, which is a blood clot that blocks the back legs, resulting in severe pain and paralysis. Sparta died in Cory's arms at 9:52 am.

Television and film
In November 2006, Williams became the host of the first national TV show to spawn from video bloggers, called The FIZZ on DirecTV channel 101 in the United States. The show features other popular video bloggers such as TheWineKone, boh3m3, TheHill88. Williams was also named as one of the "Who's Who on YouTube" by G4TV's Attack of the Show on July 31, 2008, and also made a guest appearance on Tom Green's House Tonight on The Comedy Network in Canada.

Williams has appeared on The Tonight Show with Jay Leno and MTV's Scarred.

In early October 2007, Williams starred in his first feature film role as the character "Hunter" in the movie Faded Memories, which opened in theaters on November 14, 2008. The first trailer to the movie was released on YouTube, August 3, 2008. Williams also has a cameo in the music video "Uhn Tiss Uhn Tiss Uhn Tiss" by Bloodhound Gang as well as "White People For Peace" by Against Me!.

On September 18, 2008, Williams was featured on The Tyra Show for his music video "The Mean Kitty Song." In the episode titled, "YouTube Made Me Famous," Tyra Banks announced that Williams makes a monthly income of $20,000 (US). Williams' response to Tyra's comment about his income was, "The money I make each month isn't from YouTube alone but through sponsorship, consulting, and acting gigs."

On September 17, 2009, Williams was a guest on The Bonnie Hunt Show. This was the first time his cats Sparta and Loki had been taped for television in front of a live studio audience. The topic focused on Cory's ability to comfort animals in extreme situations which led him to perform "comfort tricks" with Sparta.

On October 17, 2014, Williams appeared on Alaskan local station KTVA to talk about his experiences with his move to and life in Alaska, and about his viral video "Coolest Sound Ever." It was later announced that Williams would have a weekly slot on their Daybreak morning show, where he would talk about his latest stories and goings-on in the state.

On October 29, 2014, it was revealed that a variety of production companies had approached Williams, asking to produce a televised reality show based on his life in Alaska and his DudeLikeHELLA video blogging channel. However, he turned all the offers down, stating "Why fix what isn’t broken? We’re already loving this. This is all we’re doing. It’s just me, the camera and it’s us". Williams has said though that if an opportunity comes up later on, in which he could explore more of the world, he would be open to the idea of starring in a reality TV show.

On January 27, 2017, Williams announced that he would be a participant on the Discovery Channel reality series, Naked and Afraid. He appeared on the August 20th episode "Belize Breakdown", alongside professional surfer Anastasia Ashley, where he lasted 11 days out of a 14-day goal.

An episode of the television show Expecting aired on January 11, 2018, on Up, featured Williams and Kristen Swift, as they chronicled their pregnancy and birth of their child, Chell.

Other work
Outside of YouTube, Williams worked for a viral video project called, "I Got Shotgun" (which was created by General Motors) in which he interviewed celebrities on the red carpet about their personal opinions on the future of new media.

In the late Spring and Summer of 2012, Cory Williams and Kathleen Elliott (with friend and video man Josh Kanan) went on tour with indie rock musician Shaun Holton (also known as Projected Twin). The tour was a roughly 13,000-mile trip around the continental United States of America that acted as a series of meetups and mini-concerts for fans. Following the conclusion of the tour, the group went to Melbourne, Australia, to do a meet up with another friend and fellow YouTuber .

Williams has made all of his newer videos available to view and download in 720p HD on Vimeo, another video-sharing website that obtained high-definition capabilities before YouTube added "high quality" and "HD" features.

"As One"
Williams is the founder and West Coast American Event Coordinator of the international gathering of YouTube users dubbed "As One."  The first "As One" gathering was held in January 2007 in Hollywood, California, and Williams' associated video went on to receive over 1.3 million views. The second gathering, held at Pier 39 in San Francisco, California, managed to attract many of YouTube's highest viewed users, YouTube employees, and attention in the mainstream press.  Notable YouTubers who attended include Caitlin Hill, Ben Going, Smosh, and Paul Robinett, Yousef Abu-Taleb and Jackson Davis (the actors who play DanielBeast and jonastko in the YouTube series lonelygirl15). Another "As One" gathering was held on July 7, 2007, in New York City; one other gathering also took place on December 1, 2007, in Melbourne, Australia.

See also
 The FIZZ
 YouTube celebrities

References

External links
 SMP Films YouTube

 
 

Living people
Male actors from California
Video bloggers
1981 births
American Internet celebrities
People from Merced, California
YouTube channels launched in 2005
Male bloggers